Michael Hunt Christie (December 20, 1949 – July 11, 2019) was a professional ice hockey defenseman who played 412 games in the National Hockey League  for the California Seals, Cleveland Barons, Colorado Rockies, and Vancouver Canucks from 1974 to 1981.

Biography
Born in Big Spring, Texas, and raised in Calgary, Alberta, Christie was the first native Texan to play in the NHL although it was strictly a technicality as his father was a Canadian citizen working for an American oil company and Mike grew up in Canada.

Before turning professional, Christie played for the University of Denver men's ice hockey team, becoming a first team all-American in 1971 as well being chosen the US amateur national team at the 1972 Ice Hockey World Championship Pool B tournament. Undrafted, Christie was signed by the Chicago Black Hawks and played two minor league seasons with the Dallas Black Hawks (CHL), before being traded to the California Golden Seals in 1974. He made his NHL debut there at the start of the 1974-75 season and played until the franchise moved to Cleveland in 1977, becoming the Cleveland Barons. Christie was captain of the NHL's Colorado Rockies hockey team in the late 1970s, and his NHL career ended with the Vancouver Canucks in 1981.

He also represented the United States in the inaugural 1976 Canada Cup tournament.

Christie settled in Colorado after his hockey career ended, and started a second career as a sales representative that allowed him to enjoy his other athletic passion - golf. He represented several well-known brands, including Callaway and Top-Flite, before retiring in 2010.

Mike died of kidney disease in July 2019. He was married to his wife of 47 years, Molly (née Hamill), and had two daughters, Lisa and Colleen, a son Dan, and four grandchildren.

Awards and honors

Career statistics

Regular season and playoffs

International

References

External links 

1949 births
2019 deaths
AHCA Division I men's ice hockey All-Americans
American expatriate ice hockey players in Canada
American men's ice hockey defensemen
California Golden Seals players
Cleveland Barons (NHL) players
Colorado Rockies (NHL) players
Denver Pioneers men's ice hockey players
Ice hockey people from Texas
People from Big Spring, Texas
Ice hockey people from Calgary
Undrafted National Hockey League players
Vancouver Canucks players